The Highland Range of Clark County, Nevada, is a small  long, range south of Henderson, Nevada and separated from the southeast flank of the McCullough Range by a narrow, approximately three-mile wide valley, at the head of Piute Wash.

The Highland Range also lies on the southwest border region of the endorheic Eldorado Valley. The Highland Range Crucial Bighorn Habitat Area is a large part of the range's north, and also the alluvial plains on the northeast above Eldorado Valley.

Description
The Highland Range is about 10 miles long. A north section with a ridgeline extends somewhat into Eldorado Valley; the center and southeast gradually lower in elevation toward the southern margin of Eldorado Valley, just to the northwest of the mining area around Searchlight. The southern end of the Eldorado Mountains, which form the eastern margin of Eldorado Valley, lies just to the northeast of Searchlight.

U.S. Route 95 runs south through Eldorado Valley to the east of the Highlands to Searchlight. Nevada State Route 164 runs west from Searchlight through Paiute Wash.

References

External links

Mountain ranges of Nevada
Eldorado Valley
Mountain ranges of Clark County, Nevada
Mountain ranges of the Mojave Desert